Philippe Erne (born 14 December 1986) is a Liechtensteiner international footballer who plays as a striker for FC Ruggell, and formerly played for SC Pfullendorf, FC Vaduz, USV Eschen/Mauren, FC Chur 97 and FC Balzers.

International career

International goals
Scores and results list Liechtenstein's goal tally first.

References

1986 births
Living people
Liechtenstein footballers
Liechtenstein international footballers
FC Vaduz players
FC Chur 97 players
USV Eschen/Mauren players
SC Pfullendorf players
Association football wingers
Association football forwards
People from Vaduz